Nigel Krauth (born 8 February 1949) is an Australian novelist and academic. He is a professor at Griffith University teaching creative writing. He has published four novels and co-authored a number of young adult works.

Biography
Krauth was born in Cremorne, New South Wales. He studied at the University of Newcastle, NSW. He did a research master's at the Australian National University in 1972 and received his PhD from the University of Queensland in 1983. He taught at the University of Papua New Guinea, Mitchell CAE (now Charles Sturt University), and Southern Cross University, before his appointment at the Gold Coast CAE (which is now Griffith University).

Krauth has won several awards, including the Vogel Award (co-winner, 1982) for Matilda My Darling (pre-publication title: The Jolly Swagman Affair) and the Christina Stead Award (1991) for JF Was Here. Krauth has also judged several book awards including the "Best Fiction Book, Queensland Premier's Literary Awards" since 2002 and the "Josephine Ulrick Literature Prize" since 2004. Besides long fiction he has also written stories, plays, reviews and essays.

Krauth has edited several books and edits a scholarly journal, TEXT: Journal of Writing and Writing Courses which he co-founded with Tess Brady.

Brisbane's Albert Street Literary Trail features a plaque recording his novel, Matilda, My Darling (corner of Albert and Elizabeth Streets).

Novels
Matilda, My Darling, Allen & Unwin, 1983, 
The Bathing-Machine Called the Twentieth Century, Allen & Unwin, 1988, 
JF Was Here, Allen & Unwin, 1992, 
Freedom Highway, Allen & Unwin, 1999,

References

External links
 Official website

1949 births
Living people
20th-century Australian novelists
Australian male novelists
Australian non-fiction writers
Academic staff of Southern Cross University
Academic staff of the University of Papua New Guinea
20th-century Australian male writers
Male non-fiction writers